The Kazakhstan national under-18 and under-19 basketball team is a national basketball team of Kazakhstan, administered by the Kazakhstan Basketball Federation.
It represents the country in international under-18 and under-19 (under age 18 and under age 19) basketball competitions.

See also
Kazakhstan national basketball team
Kazakhstan men's national under-17 basketball team
Kazakhstan women's national under-19 basketball team

References

External links
 Archived records of Kazakhstan team participations

under
Men's national under-19 basketball teams